In great houses, scullery maids were the lowest-ranked and often the youngest of the female domestic servants and acted as assistant to a kitchen maid.

Description
The scullery maid reported (through the kitchen maid) to the cook or chef. Along with the junior kitchen-maid, the scullery maid did not eat at the communal servants' dining hall table, but in the kitchen in order to keep an eye on the food that was still cooking.

Duties of the scullery maid included the most physical and demanding tasks in the kitchen such as cleaning and scouring the floor, stoves, sinks, pots, and dishes. After scouring the plates in the scullery, she would leave them on racks to dry. The scullery maid also assisted in cleaning vegetables, plucking fowl, and scaling fish.

The Book of Household Management
The duties of the scullery-maid are to assist the cook; to keep the scullery clean, and all the metallic as well as earthenware kitchen utensils.

The position of scullery-maid is not, of course, one of high rank, nor is the payment for her services large. But if she be fortunate enough to have over her a good kitchen-maid and clever cook, she may very soon learn to perform various little duties connected with cooking operations, which may be of considerable service in fitting her for a more responsible place. Now, it will be doubtless thought by the majority of our readers, that the fascinations connected with the position of the scullery-maid, are not so great as to induce many people to leave a comfortable home in order to work in a scullery.

—Mrs. Beeton, The Book of Household Management, published 1861

Additional duties

The scullery maid provided hot water for the scullery, kitchen tasks, and household. In addition to her other tasks, the scullery maid had to keep the scullery clean by clearing away meat and vegetable garbage, scrubbing work tables, and swilling the floors. The water was carried through a drain outside the house. Scullery maids would rarely have handled fine china, stemware, crystal or plate silver; these are cleaned by housemaids and footmen.  Before the advent of central heating systems, scullery maids were required to light the fires on the kitchen stove and supply hot water for tea and washing. She performed these tasks in the morning before the cook came down to the kitchens.

In a household with no between maid, the scullery maid may also have waited on staff in the Servants' hall, although this may have been assigned to another maid or a junior footman.  In the days before the indoor water closet she may have been required to empty and clean the servants' chamber pots as well.

This work has, in modern (i.e. the nineteenth century) times, primarily been performed by women, but in medieval households female domestics were relatively rare. A male servant performing the tasks described above would be called a scullion. In 1386, when the English Parliament requested the removal of certain of Richard II's ministers, the king infamously responded that he would not dismiss so as much as a scullion from his kitchen at parliament's request.

The root of the word scullery is the 1300–50 French word "escuelerie" (pronounced squillerye <  equivalent to escuele -dish (< L scutella, dim. of scutra pan) + rie -ry.

Fictional scullery maids
Becky in the 1905 children's novel A Little Princess.
Snow White in the 1937 film Snow White and the Seven Dwarfs.
Katerina in the 1938 film The Girl Downstairs.
Cinderella in the 1950 film Cinderella.
Lavinia in the 1970 children's novel Thursday's Child.
Ruby Finch in the 1971–1975 television series Upstairs, Downstairs.
Annette in the 1973 novel The Princess Bride.
Evangeline in the 2005 film Nanny McPhee.
Lady Tremaine and Drizella in the 2007 film Cinderella III: A Twist in Time
Daisy Mason in the 2010–2015 television series Downton Abbey.
Bridget in the 2016 animated film Trolls.
Demelza in the 2015–2019 British television series Poldark.
Robyn in the 2020 animated film Wolfwalkers.
Arabella in the 2006 children's novel Rebel's Daughter: The 1837 Rebellion Diary of Arabella Stevenson
Elora Danan in the 2022 TV series, Willow

See also
Hall boy

References

External links
 Daily tasks according to PBS.
 The Book of Household Management, Mrs. Isabella Beeton, originally published in 1861, this web edition published by eBooks@Adelaide, some rights reserved.
 Edwardian Life at Hinchingbrooke House: The Servant's Rules
 House Tour: The Scullery
 The Olveston Experience: Images of a Scullery
 Victorian Scullery or Back Kitchen
 Image of a Scullery Maid With Fish and Fowl

 Scull
Obsolete occupations
Gendered occupations
Dishwashing